Matthew Murphy (1890–1967) was an Irish diplomat.

Details 
In 1913 he entered the Civil Service of the Republic of Ireland and served in the departments of Education, Inland Revenue, National Health Insurance and Defence.
In 1925 he joined the Department of Foreign Affairs (Ireland).
From 1925 to 1929 he was Passport Control Officer in New York.
From 1929 to 1933 he was Consul in New York.
In 1933 he was Consul in  Chicago.
From 1933 to 1947 he was Consul in San Francisco.
From 1947 to 1955 he was Chargé d’Affaires in Buenos Aires, with personal rank of Minister Plenipotentiary and opened the legation.

References

1890 births
1967 deaths
Ambassadors of Ireland to Argentina